Brazo is an American missile project.

Brazo or Brazos may also refer to:

Places 
 Brazos, Texas, an unincorporated community in Palo Pinto County, Texas
 Brazos County, Texas 
 Brazos Mountains, a range in far northern Rio Arriba County, New Mexico
 Brazos River
 Los Brazos de Santiago. A naturally occurring deep water port, at mouth of present day port of Brownsville, Texas.  El brazo en contemporary Spanish means arm, but was used by early mariners to describe an arm of the sea, or a deep water port.

Wrestlers 
 El Brazo (1961–2013), Mexican Luchador (professional wrestler)
 Brazo de Oro (wrestler) (1959–2017), Mexican Luchador (professional wrestler)
 Brazo de Plata (1963–2021), Mexican luchador (professional wrestler)
 Brazo de Platino (born 1973), Mexican luchador, or professional wrestler

Others 
 Brazos (band), the moniker of Martin McNulty Crane
 Battle of the Brazos, an athletic rivalry between Baylor University and Texas A&M University
 Brazos Press, an imprint of Baker Publishing Group
 Brazos, a generation of AMD Accelerated Processing Units

See also 
 
 Rio Brazos (disambiguation)